Brady Christensen (born September 27, 1996) is an American football offensive guard for the Carolina Panthers of the National Football League (NFL). He played college football at BYU and was drafted by the Panthers in the third round of the 2021 NFL Draft.

Early life and high school
Christensen grew up in Bountiful, Utah, and attended Bountiful High School. Christensen was rated a two-star recruit and originally committed to play college football at the Air Force Academy before changing his commitment to BYU. After graduating from Bountiful and prior to attending BYU, he served a 2-year mission for the Church of Jesus Christ of Latter-day Saints in Hamilton, New Zealand, from 2015 to 2016.

College career
Christensen redshirted his true freshman season at BYU after returning from his mission. He became the Cougars' starting left tackle going into his redshirt freshman season and started every game for them over the next two seasons. As a redshirt junior, he was named a consensus first-team All-American. Following the end of the season, he announced that he would forgo his remaining collegiate eligibility to enter the 2021 NFL Draft.

Professional career

Christensen was selected by the Carolina Panthers in the third round (70th overall) of the 2021 NFL Draft. He signed his four-year rookie contract with Carolina on June 24, 2021, worth $5.16 million.

References

External links 
BYU Cougars bio
Carolina Panthers bio

1996 births
Living people
American football offensive tackles
Players of American football from Utah
BYU Cougars football players
All-American college football players
Latter Day Saints from Utah
People from Bountiful, Utah
American Mormon missionaries in New Zealand
Carolina Panthers players